Science Rendezvous is the largest science festival in Canada; its inaugural event happened across the Greater Toronto Area (GTA) on Saturday, May 10, 2008 with the support from the University of Toronto, Ryerson University (now Toronto Metropolitan University), York University and the Ontario Tech U (previously University of Ontario Institute of Technology). By 2011 the event had gone national, with participation from most major research institutes, universities, science promotion groups and the public from all across Canada - from Vancouver to St. John's to Inuvik.  Science Rendezvous is a registered not-for-profit organization dedicated to making great science accessible to the public. In 2019, there were more than 300 festival events in 30 cities across Canada.

This free all-day event aims to highlight and promote great science in Canada. The target audience is the general public, parents, children and youth, with an ultimate aim of improving enrollment and investment in sciences and technology in the future.

Programs
There are a number of different programs that people can participate in, including:

INVENTours:
Laboratory and facility tours, demonstrations, activities and lectures at a number of science, technology, research and educational institutes.

Sipping Science:
Hosted in cafes, these are intimate discussions with renowned scientists on current hot science topics.

Science Carnival:
Demonstrations and hands-on activities in fun carnival atmosphere.

The Amazing Science Chase:
First hosted by the University of Toronto, now a national offering that has gone virtual for 2021! Teams of 2-4 participants can compete in an Amazing Race-style event with a science-twist.  Participants solve clues and apply their scientific knowledge to problem solve challenges set out as part of an exciting story within which they are immersed.

Sites/Groups that have Participated in Science Rendezvous

In the Greater Toronto Area
 Harbourfront Centre
 Hospital for Sick Children
 Let's Talk Science
 MaRS Discovery District
 Mt. Sinai Hospital's Samuel Lunenfeld Research Institute (with participation from St. Michael's Hospital, Toronto)
 Ontario College of Art and Design
 Ontario Genomics Institute
 Ontario Institute for Cancer Research
 Ontario Science Centre
 Scientists in School
 Toronto Metropolitan University
 Toronto Public Library
 Toronto Zoo
 Treehouse Group
 University Health Network
 Ontario Tech U (University of Ontario Institute of Technology)
 University of Toronto Mississauga campus
 University of Toronto St. George campus
University of Toronto Scarborough
 Xerox
 York University (including the Observatory) and Main Street, Markham
 Youth Science Ontario

Other Ontario Sites
 Carleton University
Durham College
George Brown College
 Queen's University (Science Rendezvous Kingston at the Leon's Centre)
 University of Guelph
University of Guelph-Humber
 University of Ottawa
 University of Waterloo
 University of Windsor
Western University
McMaster University

Across Canada
 Cape Breton University
 Dalhousie University
 Inner City Science Centre: Niji Mahkwa School, Winnipeg
 Kwantlen Polytechnic University
University of British Columbia
 McGill University
 Memorial University of Newfoundland
 Simon Fraser University
 Universite de Montreal
 Concordia University
 TELUS World of Science, Edmonton (with support from CIC Edmonton Local Section, Concordia University College, The King’s University College, MacEwan University, NAIT, University of Alberta, University of Alberta Campus Saint-Jean )
 University of Calgary
 University of Manitoba
 University of Regina
University of Victoria
University of Alberta
Southern Alberta Institute of Technology
University of Winnipeg
University of Saskatchewan
Aurora Research Institute
College of the North Atlantic- Labrador City 
Upstream Research, Imperial Oil Campus, Calgary 
COSIA – Canadian Oil Sands Innovation Alliance

References

External links 
 Science Rendezvous website
 photos
 City of Toronto Science Rendezvous page

Science festivals
Recurring events established in 2008
Science events in Canada
2008 establishments in Canada
Annual events in Canada
Spring (season) events in Canada